Ms. Perfect is South Korean television series starring Ko So-young, Yoon Sang-hyun, Cho Yeo-jeong and Sung Joon. It premiered on February 27, 2017 on KBS2 every Monday and Tuesday at 22:00 (KST).

Synopsis
Story of Shim Jae-bok, a middle-aged married woman who gets involved in the mysterious death of Jung Na-mi. Mystery starts unfolding in the life of Jae-bok and she rediscovers love in another person.

Cast

Main
 Ko So-young as Shim Jae-bok 
 Yoon Sang-hyun as Goo Jung-hee
 Cho Yeo-jeong as Lee Eun-hee / Moon Eun-kyung
 Kim Soo-min as Lee Eun-hee (young)
 Sung Joon as Kang Bong-goo

People around Shim Jae-bok
 Kim Jung-nan as Na Hye-ran
 Jung Soo-young as Kim Won-jae

People around Goo Jung-hee
 Im Se-mi as Jung Na-mi
 Kim Kyu-chul as Jo Young-bae
 Lee Yong-yi as Goo Jung-hee's mother

People around Lee Eun-hee
 Nam Gi-ae as Choi Duk-boon / Moon Hyung-sun

People around Kang Bong-goo
 In Gyo-jin as Hong Sam-gyu

Others
 Jeon Se-hyun as Heo Moon-sook
 Park Joon-myun as Yang Soon-bong
 Heo Eun-jung as Son Yoo-kyung
 Choi Kwon-soo as Goo Jin-wook
 Lee Ji-won as Chae Ri
 Kim Bo-min as Goo Hye-wook
 Lee Jae-wook as Doctor 
 Cha Hak-yeon as Brian Lee
 Shin Jae-won as Brian Lee (young)
 Uhm Ji-man as Detective 
 Kang Doo as Boss Ha
 Lee Min-sung as Jack
 Park Woong-bi as Jessy
 Jeon Heon-tae as Manager
 Jang Gyu-ri as Student
 Lee Yu-ri as Lee Jung-soon/Lee Yu-ri

Production
 First script reading took place on January 10, 2017 at the KBS Annex Building in Yeouido, Seoul.
 This is Ko So-young's comeback after 10 years.
 This drama serves as a reunion for both Yoon Sang-hyun and Im Se-mi who first worked together in the drama Shopping King Louis.

Ratings
In this table,  represent the lowest ratings and  represent the highest ratings.

Original soundtrack

Part 1

Part 2

Part 3

Part 4

Part 5

Part 6

Part 7

Part 8

International broadcast
  Vietnam: HTV2

Awards and nominations

References

External links
  
 

Korean Broadcasting System television dramas
Korean-language television shows
2017 South Korean television series debuts
2016 South Korean television series endings
South Korean mystery television series
Television series by KBS Media
South Korean comedy-drama television series
2017 South Korean television series endings